Eugoa clavata is a moth of the family Erebidae first described by Jeremy Daniel Holloway in 2001. It is found on Borneo. The habitat consists of lowland areas.

The length of the forewings is 7 mm. The forewings are dull greyish brown with a conspicuous discal dot and angled brown fasciae.

References

Moths described in 2001
clavata